Choi Moon-Sik (born January 6, 1971) is a retired South Korean football player who is the currently head coach of Malaysia Super League club Kelantan. He was well known for his dribbling skills and prominent technical ability. He played for the Pohang Steelers (South Korea), Chunnam Dragons (South Korea), Oita Trinita (Japan), Suwon Samsung Bluewings (South Korea) and Bucheon SK (South Korea).

He was also a participant at 1992 Summer Olympics in Spain and 1994 FIFA World Cup in the United States.

Choi was the coach of South Korea U-16 squad.

Club statistics

National team statistics

International goals
Results list South Korea's goal tally first.

External links
 
 National Team Player Record

References

1971 births
Living people
Association football midfielders
South Korean footballers
South Korean expatriate footballers
South Korea international footballers
Pohang Steelers players
Gimcheon Sangmu FC players
Jeonnam Dragons players
Oita Trinita players
Suwon Samsung Bluewings players
Jeju United FC players
K League 1 players
J2 League players
1994 FIFA World Cup players
Footballers at the 1992 Summer Olympics
Olympic footballers of South Korea
Expatriate footballers in Japan
South Korean expatriate sportspeople in Japan
South Korean football managers
Daejeon Hana Citizen FC managers
Footballers at the 1994 Asian Games
Asian Games competitors for South Korea